Africa Fashion Week Paris is an annual fashion week held in Paris, France. It is produced by Adireé Fashion Agency, partners and sponsors to bring.

Sources
Africa Fashion Week 2010, Africa.com
Africa Fashion Week New York, FashionAfrica.com

External links 
 https://africafashionweek.com/

Fashion events in France
Annual events in Paris
Culture of Paris
Fashion weeks